Shivarin (also Romanized as Shīvarīn and Shīverīn; also known as Shavarīn and Shawārin) is a village in Darsajin Rural District, in the Central District of Abhar County, Zanjan Province, Iran. At the 2006 census, its population was 124, in 35 families.

References 

Populated places in Abhar County